Tsing Yi Nature Trail, also known as Kwai Tsing Reunification Health Trail is a hiking trail on Tsing Yi Island, New Territories, Hong Kong.

At the highest point, it has a view of Rambler Channel and Ma Wan Channel, with Ting Kau Bridge and Tsing Ma Bridge spanning over.

References

Tsing Yi
Hiking trails in Hong Kong